The so-called Heart Book (Hjertebog, Copenhagen, Kongelige Bibliotek, Thott 1510, 4º) is a 16th-century Danish manuscript (Thott 1510 4o), now kept in  Det Kongelige Bibliotek, Copenhagen.

It is a collection of 83 Danish love ballads, collected in the 1550s at the court of king Christian III. It is the oldest known Danish ballad manuscript.

A peculiarity of the manuscript the entire book is heart shaped, in one of the early examples of the heart shape being used to signify romantic love.

See also
16th-century Danish literature

References

S. Grundtvig, Preve paa en ny udgave af Danmarks gamle folkeviser, 2. udg. 1847, S. 42, No. 3
V. A. Pedersen, Dansk litteraturs historie: 1100-1800, Volume 1,  p. 148f.

External links
Treasures in the Royal Library, The Heart Book  (kb.dk)
Contents list

1550s books
Ballads
Cordiform manuscripts
Danish poetry
Love poems